Teimuraz I may refer to:

 Teimuraz I of Kakheti, King in 1605–1616, 1625–1633 and 1634–1648
 Teimuraz I, Prince of Mukhrani, ruled in 1580/1605–1625
Teimuraz of Imereti, King in 1766–1768